L'Arboç is a village in the province of Tarragona and autonomous community of Catalonia, Spain.

L'Arboç contains a half-scale replica of the La Giralda in Seville. The building also contains copies of the Court of the Lions from the Alhambra, and the Hall of the Ambassadors from the Alcázar of Seville. It also contains a reproduction of the Barcelona Columbus monument.

The municipality has an exclave to the north-east.

See also
No Fem el CIM

References

External links
 Government data pages 

Municipalities in Baix Penedès